The Gorburger Show is an American comedy television series created by Ryan McNeely and Josh Martin. The series stars T.J. Miller as Gorburger, a giant blue monster who took over a Japanese television station. The series originally aired on Funny or Die for two seasons from 2012 to 2013. Guests included Jack Black, Flea, Andrew W.K., Wayne Coyne, Carson Daly, Tegan and Sara and Eagles of Death Metal. On January 13, 2017, Comedy Central picked up the series for an eight-episode first season. The series premiered on April 9, 2017, on Comedy Central. On December 19, 2017, the series was canceled after one season.

Series overview

Web series episodes

Season 1 (2012)

Season 2 (2013)

Television series episodes

References

External links
 

2017 American television series debuts
2017 American television series endings
2010s American late-night television series
English-language television shows
American comedy web series
Comedy Central original programming
American television shows featuring puppetry
Web series featuring puppetry
2012 web series debuts
2013 web series endings
Comedy Central late-night programming
Television series about monsters